John Ashton (1861-1953) was an English-born American architect from Lawrence, Massachusetts.

Life
Ashton was born September 15, 1861 in England. He immigrated to the United States in 1875, where he settled in Lawrence. He worked as a mechanic with Joseph James through at least 1889, about the time be appears to have begun to study architecture. In 1892 he enrolled in a special course in architecture in the Massachusetts Institute of Technology and opened an office of his own in 1893. He quickly rose through the profession, and became a major competitor of the more-established George G. Adams, the city's leading architect.

He was a sole practitioner until 1909, when he established a partnership with Albert Senter Huntress. The firm was expanded in 1920 to include John F. Alter. Ashton, Huntress & Alter was dissolved in 1933, when Alter opened his own office. Ashton and Huntress practiced together until 1943, when Ashton retired. Huntress continued the firm, admitting Clarence A. Pratt to the partnership. Ashton, Huntress & Pratt was dissolved upon Pratt's death in 1955.

Personal life
Ashton was married to Rebecca Woodworth, and had at least two children. He died September 30, 1953.

Legacy
Several buildings by Ashton and his firms are listed on the National Register of Historic Places.

Architectural works

John Ashton, 1893-1909

Ashton & Huntress, 1909-1920

Ashton, Huntress & Alter, 1920-1933

Ashton & Huntress, 1933-1943

Ashton, Huntress & Pratt, 1943-1955

Gallery

References

1861 births
1953 deaths
Architects from Massachusetts
People from Lawrence, Massachusetts